Cedar Grove is a historic plantation house located near Providence Forge, New Kent County, Virginia.  The main section was built about 1810, and is a -story, single pile, brick structure. The frame section was added about 1916.  It has a traditional one-room side-hall plan.  Also on the property are a contributing smokehouse and several sheds added about 1916. It was the farm residence of the Christians, a leading county family of colonial and early-Republican times. The 19th-century cemetery contains the graves of the Christian family, including Letitia Christian Tyler, the first wife of President John Tyler.

It was listed on the National Register of Historic Places in 1979.

References

External links
Cedar Grove, State Route 609, Providence Forge, New Kent County, VA 4 photos at Historic American Buildings Survey

Historic American Buildings Survey in Virginia
Tyler family residences
Houses completed in 1810
Houses in New Kent County, Virginia
Plantation houses in Virginia
Houses on the National Register of Historic Places in Virginia
National Register of Historic Places in New Kent County, Virginia